Hopton may refer to:

Places in England
Hopton, Derbyshire
Hopton-on-Sea, Norfolk
Hopton (by Nesscliffe), Shropshire
Hopton Cangeford, Shropshire
Hopton Castle and Hopton Castle (village), Shropshire
Hopton Heath, Shropshire
Hopton Wafers, Shropshire
Hopton, Staffordshire
Hopton, Suffolk
Upper Hopton, West Yorkshire

People
Arthur Hopton (1488–1555) of Cockfield Hall, Yoxford, Suffolk landowner, magistrate and MP
Arthur Hopton (died 1607), of Witham, Somerset, MP
Arthur Hopton (diplomat) (c.1588–1650), English diplomat who served as ambassador to Spain
John Hopton (died 1478) (c.1405–1478), landowner and administrator, Sheriff of Suffolk
John Hopton (naval administrator) (c.1470–1524), English naval officer and naval administrator
John Hopton (soldier) (1858–1934), British soldier, landowner, musician, and Olympic marksman
Nicholas Hopton (born 1965), British diplomat
Owen Hopton (c.1519–1595), Lieutenant of the Tower of London
Ralph Hopton (died 1571), Knight Marshal of the Household
Ralph Hopton, 1st Baron Hopton (1596–1652), Royalist commander in English Civil War
Robert Hopton (died 1590), MP, Marshal of the Household
Robert Hopton (c.1575–1638), Suffolk landowner and MP

English-language surnames